Oulun Työväen Palloilijat, (OTP for short), is a football club from Oulu, Finland.

OTP has played 16 seasons in the Finnish premier divisions Mestaruussarja and Veikkausliiga. After that there was a short lived merger with OLS called FC Oulu in the early 1990s. OTP was re-established in 1995 as FC Oulu defunct.

The club has also been playing bandy, winning the bandy championship of the Finnish Workers' Sports Federation in 1953, 1954, and 1955.

Current roster

The team's roster contains the following full internationals.

Honours 
Winners of TUL Cup: 1980, 1986, 1989, 1991

Season to season

{|  class="wikitable"
|- style="background:#f0f6fa;"
!Season
!Level
!Division
!Section
!Administration
!Position
!Movements
|-  
|style="background:#77DD77;"|1953
|style="background:#77DD77;"|Tier 3
|style="background:#77DD77;"|Suomensarjan karsinnat (Third Division)
|style="background:#77DD77;"|West Group
|style="background:#77DD77;"|Finnish FA (Suomen Pallolitto)
|style="background:#77DD77;"|3rd
|style="background:#77DD77;"|
|-  
|style="background:#77DD77;"|1954
|style="background:#77DD77;"|Tier 3
|style="background:#77DD77;"|Maakuntasarja (Third Division)
|style="background:#77DD77;"|North Group II
|style="background:#77DD77;"|Finnish FA (Suomen Pallolitto)
|style="background:#77DD77;"|1st
|style="background:#77DD77;"|Promotion West Group 2nd - Promoted
|-   
|style="background:#87CEFA;"|1955
|style="background:#87CEFA;"|Tier 2
|style="background:#87CEFA;"|Suomensarja (Second Division)|style="background:#87CEFA;"|West Group
|style="background:#87CEFA;"|Finnish FA (Suomen Palloliitto)|style="background:#87CEFA;"|9th
|style="background:#87CEFA;"|Relegated
|-  
|style="background:#77DD77;"|1956
|style="background:#77DD77;"|Tier 3
|style="background:#77DD77;"|Maakuntasarja (Third Division)|style="background:#77DD77;"|North Group I
|style="background:#77DD77;"|Finnish FA (Suomen Pallolitto)|style="background:#77DD77;"|1st
|style="background:#77DD77;"|Promotion Playoff - Promoted
|-   
|style="background:#87CEFA;"|1957
|style="background:#87CEFA;"|Tier 2
|style="background:#87CEFA;"|Suomensarja (Second Division)|style="background:#87CEFA;"|West Group
|style="background:#87CEFA;"|Finnish FA (Suomen Palloliitto)|style="background:#87CEFA;"|6th
|style="background:#87CEFA;"|
|-   
|style="background:#87CEFA;"|1958
|style="background:#87CEFA;"|Tier 2
|style="background:#87CEFA;"|Suomensarja (Second Division)|style="background:#87CEFA;"|North Group
|style="background:#87CEFA;"|Finnish FA (Suomen Palloliitto)|style="background:#87CEFA;"|5th
|style="background:#87CEFA;"|
|-   
|style="background:#87CEFA;"|1959
|style="background:#87CEFA;"|Tier 2
|style="background:#87CEFA;"|'''Suomensarja (Second Division)
|style="background:#87CEFA;"|North Group
|style="background:#87CEFA;"|Finnish FA (Suomen Palloliitto)
|style="background:#87CEFA;"|6th|style="background:#87CEFA;"|
|-   
|style="background:#87CEFA;"|1960
|style="background:#87CEFA;"|Tier 2
|style="background:#87CEFA;"|Suomensarja (Second Division)
|style="background:#87CEFA;"|North Group
|style="background:#87CEFA;"|Finnish FA (Suomen Palloliitto)
|style="background:#87CEFA;"|7th|style="background:#87CEFA;"|
|-   
|style="background:#87CEFA;"|1961
|style="background:#87CEFA;"|Tier 2
|style="background:#87CEFA;"|Suomensarja (Second Division)
|style="background:#87CEFA;"|North Group
|style="background:#87CEFA;"|Finnish FA (Suomen Palloliitto)
|style="background:#87CEFA;"|4th|style="background:#87CEFA;"|
|-   
|style="background:#87CEFA;"|1962
|style="background:#87CEFA;"|Tier 2
|style="background:#87CEFA;"|Suomensarja (Second Division)|style="background:#87CEFA;"|North Group
|style="background:#87CEFA;"|Finnish FA (Suomen Palloliitto)|style="background:#87CEFA;"|2nd
|style="background:#87CEFA;"|
|-   
|style="background:#87CEFA;"|1963
|style="background:#87CEFA;"|Tier 2
|style="background:#87CEFA;"|Suomensarja (Second Division)|style="background:#87CEFA;"|North Group
|style="background:#87CEFA;"|Finnish FA (Suomen Palloliitto)|style="background:#87CEFA;"|9th
|style="background:#87CEFA;"|
|-   
|style="background:#87CEFA;"|1964
|style="background:#87CEFA;"|Tier 2
|style="background:#87CEFA;"|Suomensarja (Second Division)|style="background:#87CEFA;"|North Group
|style="background:#87CEFA;"|Finnish FA (Suomen Palloliitto)|style="background:#87CEFA;"|6th
|style="background:#87CEFA;"|
|-   
|style="background:#87CEFA;"|1965
|style="background:#87CEFA;"|Tier 2
|style="background:#87CEFA;"|Suomensarja (Second Division)|style="background:#87CEFA;"|North Group
|style="background:#87CEFA;"|Finnish FA (Suomen Palloliitto)|style="background:#87CEFA;"|1st
|style="background:#87CEFA;"|Promoted
|- 
|style="background:#FFFF00;"|1966
|style="background:#FFFF00;"|Tier 1
|style="background:#FFFF00;"|Mestaruussarja (Premier League)|style="background:#FFFF00;"|
|style="background:#FFFF00;"|Finnish FA (Suomen Palloliitto)|style="background:#FFFF00;"|12th
|style="background:#FFFF00;"|Relegated
|-   
|style="background:#87CEFA;"|1967
|style="background:#87CEFA;"|Tier 2
|style="background:#87CEFA;"|Suomensarja (Second Division)|style="background:#87CEFA;"|North Group
|style="background:#87CEFA;"|Finnish FA (Suomen Palloliitto)|style="background:#87CEFA;"|1st
|style="background:#87CEFA;"|Promotion Group 3rd
|-   
|style="background:#87CEFA;"|1968
|style="background:#87CEFA;"|Tier 2
|style="background:#87CEFA;"|Suomensarja (Second Division)|style="background:#87CEFA;"|North Group
|style="background:#87CEFA;"|Finnish FA (Suomen Palloliitto)|style="background:#87CEFA;"|1st
|style="background:#87CEFA;"|Promotion Group 3rd
|-   
|style="background:#87CEFA;"|1969
|style="background:#87CEFA;"|Tier 2
|style="background:#87CEFA;"|Suomensarja (Second Division)|style="background:#87CEFA;"|North Group
|style="background:#87CEFA;"|Finnish FA (Suomen Palloliitto)|style="background:#87CEFA;"|2nd
|style="background:#87CEFA;"|
|-   
|style="background:#87CEFA;"|1970
|style="background:#87CEFA;"|Tier 2
|style="background:#87CEFA;"|'''II Divisioona (Second Division)
|style="background:#87CEFA;"|North Group
|style="background:#87CEFA;"|Finnish FA (Suomen Palloliitto)
|style="background:#87CEFA;"|2nd|style="background:#87CEFA;"|Promotion Group 1st - Promoted
|- 
|style="background:#FFFF00;"|1971
|style="background:#FFFF00;"|Tier 1
|style="background:#FFFF00;"|Mestaruussarja (Premier League)
|style="background:#FFFF00;"|
|style="background:#FFFF00;"|Finnish FA (Suomen Palloliitto)
|style="background:#FFFF00;"|12th|style="background:#FFFF00;"|Relegated
|-   
|style="background:#87CEFA;"|1972
|style="background:#87CEFA;"|Tier 2
|style="background:#87CEFA;"|II Divisioona (Second Division)
|style="background:#87CEFA;"|North Group
|style="background:#87CEFA;"|Finnish FA (Suomen Palloliitto)
|style="background:#87CEFA;"|1st|style="background:#87CEFA;"|Promoted
|- 
|style="background:#FFFF00;"|1973
|style="background:#FFFF00;"|Tier 1
|style="background:#FFFF00;"|Mestaruussarja (Premier League)
|style="background:#FFFF00;"|
|style="background:#FFFF00;"|Finnish FA (Suomen Palloliitto)
|style="background:#FFFF00;"|5th|style="background:#FFFF00;"|
|- 
|style="background:#FFFF00;"|1974
|style="background:#FFFF00;"|Tier 1
|style="background:#FFFF00;"|Mestaruussarja (Premier League)
|style="background:#FFFF00;"|
|style="background:#FFFF00;"|Finnish FA (Suomen Palloliitto)
|style="background:#FFFF00;"|7th|style="background:#FFFF00;"|
|- 
|style="background:#FFFF00;"|1975
|style="background:#FFFF00;"|Tier 1
|style="background:#FFFF00;"|Mestaruussarja (Premier League)
|style="background:#FFFF00;"|
|style="background:#FFFF00;"|Finnish FA (Suomen Palloliitto)
|style="background:#FFFF00;"|11th|style="background:#FFFF00;"|Relegation Playoff - Relegated
|-   
|style="background:#87CEFA;"|1976
|style="background:#87CEFA;"|Tier 2
|style="background:#87CEFA;"|I Divisioona (First Division)
|style="background:#87CEFA;"|
|style="background:#87CEFA;"|Finnish FA (Suomen Palloliitto)
|style="background:#87CEFA;"|2nd|style="background:#87CEFA;"|Promoted
|- 
|style="background:#FFFF00;"|1977
|style="background:#FFFF00;"|Tier 1
|style="background:#FFFF00;"|Mestaruussarja (Premier League)
|style="background:#FFFF00;"|
|style="background:#FFFF00;"|Finnish FA (Suomen Palloliitto)
|style="background:#FFFF00;"|10th|style="background:#FFFF00;"|
|- 
|style="background:#FFFF00;"|1978
|style="background:#FFFF00;"|Tier 1
|style="background:#FFFF00;"|Mestaruussarja (Premier League)
|style="background:#FFFF00;"|
|style="background:#FFFF00;"|Finnish FA (Suomen Palloliitto)
|style="background:#FFFF00;"|12th|style="background:#FFFF00;"|Relegated
|-   
|style="background:#87CEFA;"|1979
|style="background:#87CEFA;"|Tier 2
|style="background:#87CEFA;"|I Divisioona (First Division)
|style="background:#87CEFA;"|
|style="background:#87CEFA;"|Finnish FA (Suomen Palloliitto)
|style="background:#87CEFA;"|2nd|style="background:#87CEFA;"|Promotion Group 2nd - Promoted
|- 
|style="background:#FFFF00;"|1980
|style="background:#FFFF00;"|Tier 1
|style="background:#FFFF00;"|SM-Sarja (Premier League)
|style="background:#FFFF00;"|
|style="background:#FFFF00;"|Finnish FA (Suomen Palloliitto)
|style="background:#FFFF00;"|9th|style="background:#FFFF00;"|Relegation Group 7th - Relegated
|-   
|style="background:#87CEFA;"|1981
|style="background:#87CEFA;"|Tier 2
|style="background:#87CEFA;"|I Divisioona (First Division)
|style="background:#87CEFA;"|
|style="background:#87CEFA;"|Finnish FA (Suomen Palloliitto)
|style="background:#87CEFA;"|8th|style="background:#87CEFA;"|Relegation Group 1st
|-   
|style="background:#87CEFA;"|1982
|style="background:#87CEFA;"|Tier 2
|style="background:#87CEFA;"|I Divisioona (First Division)
|style="background:#87CEFA;"|
|style="background:#87CEFA;"|Finnish FA (Suomen Palloliitto)
|style="background:#87CEFA;"|6th|style="background:#87CEFA;"|Relegation Group 4th
|-   
|style="background:#87CEFA;"|1983
|style="background:#87CEFA;"|Tier 2
|style="background:#87CEFA;"|I Divisioona (First Division)
|style="background:#87CEFA;"|
|style="background:#87CEFA;"|Finnish FA (Suomen Palloliitto)
|style="background:#87CEFA;"|5th
|style="background:#87CEFA;"|Relegation Group 1st
|-   
|style="background:#87CEFA;"|1984
|style="background:#87CEFA;"|Tier 2
|style="background:#87CEFA;"|I Divisioona (First Division)|style="background:#87CEFA;"|
|style="background:#87CEFA;"|Finnish FA (Suomen Palloliitto)|style="background:#87CEFA;"|1st
|style="background:#87CEFA;"|Promoted
|- 
|style="background:#FFFF00;"|1985
|style="background:#FFFF00;"|Tier 1
|style="background:#FFFF00;"|SM-Sarja (Premier League)|style="background:#FFFF00;"|
|style="background:#FFFF00;"|Finnish FA (Suomen Palloliitto)|style="background:#FFFF00;"|10th
|style="background:#FFFF00;"|
|- 
|style="background:#FFFF00;"|1986
|style="background:#FFFF00;"|Tier 1
|style="background:#FFFF00;"|SM-Sarja (Premier League)|style="background:#FFFF00;"|
|style="background:#FFFF00;"|Finnish FA (Suomen Palloliitto)|style="background:#FFFF00;"|12th
|style="background:#FFFF00;"|Relegated
|-   
|style="background:#87CEFA;"|1987
|style="background:#87CEFA;"|Tier 2
|style="background:#87CEFA;"|'''I Divisioona (First Division)
|style="background:#87CEFA;"|
|style="background:#87CEFA;"|Finnish FA (Suomen Palloliitto)
|style="background:#87CEFA;"|1st|style="background:#87CEFA;"|Promoted
|- 
|style="background:#FFFF00;"|1988
|style="background:#FFFF00;"|Tier 1
|style="background:#FFFF00;"|SM-Sarja (Premier League)
|style="background:#FFFF00;"|
|style="background:#FFFF00;"|Finnish FA (Suomen Palloliitto)
|style="background:#FFFF00;"|10th|style="background:#FFFF00;"|Relegation Group 4th
|- 
|style="background:#FFFF00;"|1989
|style="background:#FFFF00;"|Tier 1
|style="background:#FFFF00;"|SM-Sarja (Premier League)
|style="background:#FFFF00;"|
|style="background:#FFFF00;"|Finnish FA (Suomen Palloliitto)
|style="background:#FFFF00;"|10th|style="background:#FFFF00;"|Relegation Group 3rd
|- 
|style="background:#FFFF00;"|1990
|style="background:#FFFF00;"|Tier 1
|style="background:#FFFF00;"|Futisliiga (Premier League)
|style="background:#FFFF00;"|
|style="background:#FFFF00;"|Finnish FA (Suomen Palloliitto)
|style="background:#FFFF00;"|10th|style="background:#FFFF00;"|
|- 
|style="background:#FFFF00;"|1991
|style="background:#FFFF00;"|Tier 1
|style="background:#FFFF00;"|Futisliiga (Premier League)
|style="background:#FFFF00;"|
|style="background:#FFFF00;"|Finnish FA (Suomen Palloliitto)
|style="background:#FFFF00;"|11th|style="background:#FFFF00;"|Relegation Playoff
|- 
|style="background:;"|1992-94
|style="background:;"|Merged with OLS to form FC Oulu
|style="background:;"|
|-  
|style="background:#77DD77;"|1996
|style="background:#77DD77;"|Tier 3
|style="background:#77DD77;"|Kakkonen (Second Division)
|style="background:#77DD77;"|North Group
|style="background:#77DD77;"|Finnish FA (Suomen Pallolitto)
|style="background:#77DD77;"|5th|style="background:#77DD77;"|
|-  
|style="background:#77DD77;"|1997
|style="background:#77DD77;"|Tier 3
|style="background:#77DD77;"|Kakkonen (Second Division)
|style="background:#77DD77;"|North Group
|style="background:#77DD77;"|Finnish FA (Suomen Pallolitto)
|style="background:#77DD77;"|12th|style="background:#77DD77;"|Relegated
|- 
|style="background:#FF7F00;"|1998
|style="background:#FF7F00;"|Tier 4
|style="background:#FF7F00;"|Kolmonen (Third Division)
|style="background:#FF7F00;"|Group 8 Oulu-Kainuu
|style="background:#FF7F00;"|Northern Finland (SPL Pohjois-Suomi)
|style="background:#FF7F00;"|4th|style="background:#FF7F00;"|
|- 
|style="background:#FF7F00;"|1999
|style="background:#FF7F00;"|Tier 4
|style="background:#FF7F00;"|Kolmonen (Third Division)
|style="background:#FF7F00;"|Group 8 Oulu-Kainuu
|style="background:#FF7F00;"|Northern Finland (SPL Pohjois-Suomi)
|style="background:#FF7F00;"|5th|style="background:#FF7F00;"|Relegation Group 2nd
|- 
|style="background:#FF7F00;"|2000
|style="background:#FF7F00;"|Tier 4
|style="background:#FF7F00;"|Kolmonen (Third Division)
|style="background:#FF7F00;"|Oulu-Kainuu
|style="background:#FF7F00;"|Northern Finland (SPL Pohjois-Suomi)
|style="background:#FF7F00;"|3rd|style="background:#FF7F00;"|
|- 
|style="background:#FF7F00;"|2001
|style="background:#FF7F00;"|Tier 4
|style="background:#FF7F00;"|Kolmonen (Third Division)
|style="background:#FF7F00;"|Oulu-Kainuu
|style="background:#FF7F00;"|Northern Finland (SPL Pohjois-Suomi)
|style="background:#FF7F00;"|10th|style="background:#FF7F00;"|Relegated
|- 
|style="background:;"|2002
|style="background:;"|Merged with Tervarit, OLS and OPS to form AC Oulu
|style="background:;"|
|- 
|style="background:;"|2002-08
|style="background:;"|Only youth teams
|style="background:;"|
|-
|style="background:#FBA0E3;"|2010
|style="background:#FBA0E3;"|Tier 6
|style="background:#FBA0E3;"|Vitonen (Fifth Division)
|style="background:#FBA0E3;"|
|style="background:#FBA0E3;"|Northern Finland (SPL Pohjois-Suomi)
|style="background:#FBA0E3;"|2nd|style="background:#FBA0E3;"|Promoted
|-
|style="background:#CECE1B;"|2011
|style="background:#CECE1B;"|Tier 5
|style="background:#CECE1B;"|Nelonen (Fourth Division)
|style="background:#CECE1B;"|Oulu
|style="background:#CECE1B;"|Northern Finland (SPL Pohjois-Suomi)
|style="background:#CECE1B;"|1st|style="background:#CECE1B;"|
|-
|style="background:#CECE1B;"|2012
|style="background:#CECE1B;"|Tier 5
|style="background:#CECE1B;"|Nelonen (Fourth Division)
|style="background:#CECE1B;"|Oulu
|style="background:#CECE1B;"|Northern Finland (SPL Pohjois-Suomi)
|style="background:#CECE1B;"|4th|style="background:#CECE1B;"|
|- 
|style="background:#FF7F00;"|2013
|style="background:#FF7F00;"|Tier 4
|style="background:#FF7F00;"|Kolmonen (Third Division)
|style="background:#FF7F00;"|
|style="background:#FF7F00;"|Northern Finland (SPL Pohjois-Suomi)
|style="background:#FF7F00;"|11th|style="background:#FF7F00;"|Relegated
|-
|style="background:#CECE1B;"|2014
|style="background:#CECE1B;"|Tier 5
|style="background:#CECE1B;"|Nelonen (Fourth Division)
|style="background:#CECE1B;"|Oulu
|style="background:#CECE1B;"|Northern Finland (SPL Pohjois-Suomi)
|style="background:#CECE1B;"|3rd|style="background:#CECE1B;"|
|-
|style="background:#CECE1B;"|2015
|style="background:#CECE1B;"|Tier 5
|style="background:#CECE1B;"|Nelonen (Fourth Division)
|style="background:#CECE1B;"|Oulu-Kainuu
|style="background:#CECE1B;"|Northern Finland (SPL Pohjois-Suomi)
|style="background:#CECE1B;"|2nd|style="background:#CECE1B;"|
|- 
|style="background:#FF7F00;"|2016
|style="background:#FF7F00;"|Tier 4
|style="background:#FF7F00;"|Kolmonen (Third Division)
|style="background:#FF7F00;"|
|style="background:#FF7F00;"|Northern Finland (SPL Pohjois-Suomi)
|style="background:#FF7F00;"|2nd|style="background:#FF7F00;"|Promoted
|-  
|style="background:#77DD77;"|2017
|style="background:#77DD77;"|Tier 3
|style="background:#77DD77;"|Kakkonen (Second Division)
|style="background:#77DD77;"|Group C
|style="background:#77DD77;"|Finnish FA (Suomen Pallolitto)
|style="background:#77DD77;"|12th|style="background:#77DD77;"|Relegated
|- 
|style="background:#FF7F00;"|2018
|style="background:#FF7F00;"|Tier 4
|style="background:#FF7F00;"|Kolmonen (Third Division)
|style="background:#FF7F00;"|
|style="background:#FF7F00;"|Northern Finland (SPL Pohjois-Suomi)
|style="background:#FF7F00;"|5th|style="background:#FF7F00;"|
|- 
|style="background:#FF7F00;"|2019
|style="background:#FF7F00;"|Tier 4
|style="background:#FF7F00;"|Kolmonen (Third Division)
|style="background:#FF7F00;"|
|style="background:#FF7F00;"|Northern Finland (SPL Pohjois-Suomi)
|style="background:#FF7F00;"|7th|style="background:#FF7F00;"|
|-  
|}                                                                                                                                             14 seasons in Veikkausliiga22 seasons in Ykkönen6 seasons in Kakkonen8 seasons in Kolmonen4 seasons in Nelonen1' seasons in Vitonen''

References

External links 
OTP Official Homepage

Football clubs in Finland
Bandy clubs in Finland
Sport in Oulu
Association football clubs established in 1946
Bandy clubs established in 1946